Corral is a surname. Notable people with the surname include:

Alejo Corral (born 1981), Argentine rugby union player
Álvaro Corral (born 1983), Spanish footballer
Calum Corral (born 1976), Scottish journalist
Charlyn Corral (born 1991), Mexican footballer
Daniel Corral (born 1990), Mexican gymnast
Daniel Corral (composer) (born 1981), American composer and musician
Eduardo C. Corral, American poet
Frank Corral (born 1955), Mexican player of American football
George Corral (born 1990), Mexican footballer
Imanol Corral (born 1994), Spanish footballer
José Andrés Corral Arredondo (1946–2011), Mexican Roman Catholic bishop
Leticia Corral (born 1959), Mexican mathematician
Manuel Corral (1934–2011), Spanish antipope
Matías Corral (born 1968), Argentine rugby union player
Matt Corral (born 1999), American football player
Oscar J. Corral (born 1974), American journalist
Pablo Corral (born 1992), Chilean footballer
Pablo Corral Embade (born 1972), Spanish Paralympic swimmer
Ramón Corral (1854–1912), Vice President of Mexico
Ramón Corral Ávila (born 1946), Mexican lawyer and politician
Raquel Corral, Spanish synchronized swimmer
Rodrigo Corral, American graphic artist
Simón Corral (born 1946), Ecuadorian poet and dramatist
Valerie Corral, American cannabis activist